A total of 464 athletes will compete at the volleyball competitions at the 2015 European Games; 336 in indoor volleyball and 128 in beach volleyball. Most of the qualification places will be based on the CEV Rankings as of 1 January 2015.

Qualification summary

Indoor

Men

Women

Beach

Men

Women

Sources
 Indoor Volleyball Qualifiers

References

Qualification
Qualification for the 2015 European Games